Argirita is a Brazilian municipality located in the state of Minas Gerais. Its population  is estimated to be 2,704 people living in a total area of 159.326 km². The city belongs to the mesoregion of Zona da Mata and to the microregion of Cataguases.

See also
 List of municipalities in Minas Gerais

References

Municipalities in Minas Gerais